Novatus Rugambwa (born 8 October 1957) is a Tanzanian prelate of the Roman Catholic Church and diplomat of the Holy See.

Biography
Novatus Rugambwa was born on 8 October 1957, in Bukoba, Tanzania, and was ordained a priest on 6 July 1986, for the Diocese of Bukoba. He holds a degree in canon law. In 1987 he was admitted to the Pontifical Ecclesiastical Academy to study diplomacy.

Rugambwa entered the diplomatic service of the Holy See on 1 July 1991, and served in the pontifical diplomatic missions in Panama, Republic of Congo, Pakistan, New Zealand and Indonesia. He was named undersecretary of the Pontifical Council for the Pastoral Care of Migrants and Itinerants on 28 June 2007.

On 6 February 2010 he was named Titular Archbishop of Tagaria and apostolic nuncio to São Tomé and Príncipe. He was named apostolic nuncio to Angola on 20 February 2010 as well. His episcopal consecration took place on 18 March 2010; Cardinal Tarcisio Bertone was the principal consecrator, with bishops Pier Giorgio Micchiardi and Nestorius Timanywa, as principal co-consecrators.

Pope Francis named him nuncio to Honduras on 5 March 2015.

On 29 March 2019, Pope Francis named Rugambwa apostolic nuncio to New Zealand and apostolic delegate to the countries of the Pacific Ocean. On 25 May the responsibilities of Apostolic Nuncio to Fiji and to Palau were assigned to him. On 30 November he was given additional responsibility as Apostolic Nuncio to the Marshall Islands, Kiribati, Nauru, and Tonga. On 17 April 2020, he was named Apostolic Nuncio to Samoa as well. On 2 February 2021, Rugambwa was appointed Apostolic Nuncio to the Cook Islands, a post that had been vacant since 2018, and on 30 March to Micronesia.

See also
 List of heads of the diplomatic missions of the Holy See

References

External links
 Novatus Rugambwa at Catholic Hierarchy 

 

1957 births
Living people
21st-century Roman Catholic titular archbishops
Officials of the Roman Curia
Pontifical Ecclesiastical Academy alumni
Apostolic Nuncios to São Tomé and Príncipe
Apostolic Nuncios to Angola
Apostolic Nuncios to Honduras
Apostolic Nuncios to New Zealand
Apostolic Nuncios to Fiji
Apostolic Nuncios to Palau
Apostolic Nuncios to Kiribati
Apostolic Nuncios to Tonga
Apostolic Nuncios to Nauru
Apostolic Nuncios to the Marshall Islands
Apostolic Nuncios to the Pacific Ocean
Apostolic Nuncios to Samoa
Apostolic Nuncios to the Cook Islands
Apostolic Nuncios to the Federated States of Micronesia
Tanzanian Roman Catholic archbishops
People from Bukoba